Crust may refer to:

Common meanings

Food 
 Crust (baking), the outer layer composed of pastry or salt
 Crust, the bread foundation of pizza
 Bread crust, the dense surface layer of bread

Physical sciences 
 Crust (geology), the outer layer of a rocky planetary body
 Soil crust, the soil surface layer

Arts, entertainment, and media

Music 
 Crust (album), by Sadist, 1997
 Crust (band), an American band in the 1980s
 Crust (EP), by Sarcófago
 Crust punk, also known as crust, a music genre

Other uses in arts, entertainment, and media 
 The Crust, a television series, aired until 2005 on BBC One

Other uses 
 Crust (dermatology)
 Crust fungi, another name for corticioid fungi
 Crust, a a character in My Hero Academia

See also 
 Krusty the Clown, fictional character in The Simpsons television series
 Upper crust (disambiguation)